Joseph Beverley (by 1520 – will made and proven 1561), of Faversham and Dover, Kent, was an English politician. He was a Member of Parliament (MP) for Dover in 1547, 1553, and 1558, and for Winchelsea in 1554.

References

1561 deaths
Members of the Parliament of England for Dover
People from Faversham
English MPs 1547–1552
Year of birth uncertain
English MPs 1553 (Mary I)
English MPs 1554
English MPs 1558